Malton railway station is a Grade II listed station which serves the towns of Malton and Norton-on-Derwent in North Yorkshire, England. Situated  on the York to Scarborough Line, it is operated by TransPennine Express, who provide all passenger train services.

History
Services from Malton station started on 7 July 1845 when the York to Scarborough Line was opened. The station buildings were designed by the architect George Townsend Andrews.

On 3 May 1870, there was a gas explosion at the station. The platform edging stones were built on a double wall of bricks, separated by a gap, into which gas had leaked. A porter passing with a lamp caused the explosion, which lifted a  length of the flagstones off the platform.

The station is only served by trains between Scarborough and York (and beyond), however prior to the Beeching cuts, Malton station was also served by the Pickering Branch of the York and North Midland Railway with trains heading north (diverging at Rillington junction) to Pickering and then onwards to Grosmont and Whitby. This line closed entirely north of Pickering in 1965, with a freight-only service to Pickering surviving until 1966.

Trains still run from Pickering to Grosmont as part of the preserved North Yorkshire Moors Railway, but the tracks between Rillington, where the line branched, and Pickering have since been lifted.

Until 1958 the Malton & Driffield Railway, with trains heading south to Driffield, survived for freight and the occasional (summer-only) through excursion to the coast. After 1958 excursion and express trains from the Thirsk and Malton Line had to reverse at Scarborough Road junction on the easterly edge of Malton, back down towards Malton station before reversing again and heading off to Scarborough. Prior to 1950, there had been a passenger service nicknamed the 'Malton Dodger' between Malton and Driffield.

As an interchange between three lines, Malton station was considerably busier than it is now.

Though Malton station now has only one platform in use, at its peak, there were two through platforms and an additional bay platform serving (mainly) Whitby local trains. The George Townsend Andrews overall roof was removed in 1989 and replaced by the canopy recovered from the Whitby platform.

One of Malton station's claim to fame was the novel solution adopted to allow passengers to access the second (island) platform, instead of a footbridge or barrow crossing the NER installed a removable section of platform, in the form of a wheeled trolley running on rails set at right-angles to the (single) running line. When a train had to use the platform, the trolley was wheeled back under the up (York) platform; the trolley was interlocked, with the signals giving access to the platform.

Arriva Trains Northern operated services from Blackpool to Scarborough that stopped at Malton. This service was usually worked by a Metro liveried Class 158, occasionally a Class 155. There was also a local service from York to Scarborough usually worked by a Pacer or a Class 156. When the franchise was relet, services on the line were taken over by First TransPennine Express in February 2004 that operated services from Liverpool to Scarborough.

Before May 2018, trains to Liverpool were routed via the southern Liverpool-Manchester route, serving Manchester Piccadilly instead of Manchester Victoria. In May 2020, Northern Trains was due to commence serving Malton when it introduced a York to Scarborough service. These plans were shelved following the pandemic and no new date has been given for the service to be introduced.

Station masters

W.H. Nicholson ca. 1866 - 1891
George H. Saxby 1891 - 1897
William Thompson 1897 - 1900 (afterwards station master at Nottingham Victoria)
George Henry Stephenson 1900 - 1902 (formerly station master at Church Fenton, afterwards station master at Darlington)
G.W. Laidler 1902 - ???? (formerly station master at Church Fenton)
Mark Lupton 1923 - 1933 (formerly station master at Castleford, afterwards station master at Middlesbrough)
John Proudfoot 1933 - 1950 (formerly station master at Ripon)
H. Mattison 1951 - 1960 (formerly station master at Driffield)
R. Tunnicliffe ???? - 1961 (afterwards yard master at Wath Yard)
F. Newlove 1961 - 1965 (formerly station master at Driffield)

Facilities and Services
The station is staffed, with the ticket office open from start of service until 19:30 each day.  Ticket machines are also available.  Automated train announcements and passenger information screens provide train running information and there is step-free access to the platform from the station entrance and ticket hall.  A cafe and taxi office are also located within the main building.

The typical off-peak service is:

Proposed future developments
A half-hourly service, with timetable and fares integration with Yorkshire Coastliner buses, has been suggested as a means of providing relief to the parallel A64 trunk road that would be considerably cheaper than the option of a dual carriageway.

There has been talk of reopening the old line between Rillington Junction and Pickering for some years, most notably in 2003, but no attempt has come to fruition.

There was a petition on 10 Downing Street to reopen the line and upgrade the North Yorkshire Moors railway to cope with higher speeds (40-50 mph as opposed to 25 mph), to improve transport in the region, and to provide relief for the A64 more cheaply than dualling it in its entirety.

From time to time the prospect of extending the North Yorkshire Moors Railway line from Pickering to Malton is raised. However, this is not in the immediate vision of the North Yorkshire Moors Railway.

References

North Eastern Railway, Its Rise and Development; by W.W.Tomlinson 1914 original available here

External links

Malton Station from Ryedale on the Web
Malton station at The Yorkshire Wolds Railway Restoration Project

Railway stations in North Yorkshire
DfT Category E stations
Grade II listed buildings in North Yorkshire
Railway stations in Great Britain opened in 1845
Railway stations served by TransPennine Express
Malton, North Yorkshire
Former York and North Midland Railway stations
George Townsend Andrews railway stations
Grade II listed railway stations
Norton-on-Derwent